was a general in the Imperial Japanese Army during the World War II.

Biography

Early career
Yoshimoto was the eldest son of an indigo merchant from Tokushima Prefecture. He was born in Tokyo, but his birth was registered in Tokushima. He graduated from the 20th class of the Imperial Japanese Army Academy in 1908 and 28th class of the Army Staff College in 1916 and was assigned to staff positions within the Imperial General Headquarters upon graduation. 

In 1919 he was sent as a military attaché to France, returning in 1922. He remained in various administrative and bureaucratic positions within the Army Staff until 1933, when he was assigned command of the IJA 68th Infantry Regiment. He was promoted to major general in 1936 and assigned command of the IJA 21st Infantry Brigade. In 1937, he became Chief of Staff of the Tokyo Metropolitan Military Police, in charge of organizing defenses for eastern Japan.

World War II
In June 1938, Yoshimoto became chief-of-staff of the newly-formed IJA 11th Army. This force was part of the Japanese Central China Area Army and assigned the task of conquering and occupying the central provinces of China between the Yangtze River and the Yellow River during the Second Sino-Japanese War. The 11th Army played a major role in the Battle of Wuhan. From September 1939, it came under the newly formed China Expeditionary Army and Yoshimoto became chief-of-staff of the China Expeditionary Army from January 1939. He was promoted to lieutenant general that March and assigned command of the IJA 2nd Division that November. 

On April 29, 1940, Yoshimoto was awarded the Order of  the Golden Kite, 2nd class and the Grand Cordon of the Order of the Rising Sun. In April 1941, he became chief of staff of the Kwangtung Army and from April 1942 was assigned command of the IJA 1st Army. During this time, the 1st Army was largely a garrison force in Manchukou. He was Imperial General Headquarters. In February 1945, he was assigned to the newly-created Japanese Eleventh Area Army. This force was part of the last desperate defense effort by the Empire of Japan to deter possible landings of Allied forces in Honshū during Operation Downfall and was responsible for the Tōhoku region of Japan from its headquarters in Sendai, Miyagi. On May 7, 1945 he was promoted to general, and in June received the honorific title of Junior Third Court Rank. On September 14, 1945, shortly after the surrender of Japan, he committed suicide at The Imperial Japanese Army headquarters in Ichigaya, Tokyo.

Career 
 December 1908: Second Lieutenant
 December 1911: First Lieutenant
 October 1918:  Captain
 August 1923: Major
 March 1928: Lieutenant colonel
 August 1, 1931: Colonel
 March 7, 1936: Major general
 March 9, 1939: Lieutenant general
 May 7, 1945: General

References

1887 births
1945 deaths
People from Tokushima Prefecture
Imperial Japanese Army generals of World War II
Japanese military attachés
Japanese generals
Japanese military personnel who committed suicide
People of the Second Sino-Japanese War
Members of the Kwantung Army
Grand Cordons of the Order of the Rising Sun
Recipients of the Order of the Golden Kite, 2nd class